German submarine U-519 was a Type IXC U-boat of Nazi Germany's Kriegsmarine during World War II. She was laid down on 23 June 1941 at the Deutsche Werft yard in Hamburg as yard number 334, launched on 12 February 1942 and commissioned on 7 May 1942 under the command of Kapitänleutnant Günter Eppen.

After training with the 4th U-boat Flotilla, U-519 was transferred to the 2nd U-boat Flotilla for front-line service on 1 November 1942.

Design
German Type IXC submarines were slightly larger than the original Type IXBs. U-519 had a displacement of  when at the surface and  while submerged. She had two shafts and two  propellers.

U-519 was fitted with six  torpedo tubes (four fitted at the bow and two at the stern), 22 torpedoes, one  SK C/32 naval gun, 180 rounds, and a  SK C/30 as well as a  C/30 anti-aircraft gun. The boat had a complement of forty-eight.

Service history

First patrol
The U-boat left Kiel on 17 October 1942, moved through the gap between Iceland and the Faeroe Islands into the Atlantic Ocean and patrolled the vicinity of the Azores, joining the wolfpack Westwall between 8 November and 16 December. However she had no successes. She arrived at Lorient in occupied France on 29 December after 74 days at sea.

Second patrol
The boat departed Lorient for the last time on 30 January 1943. She has been posted missing since 31 January 1943. She was previously thought to have been sunk by "Tidewater Tillie," a B-24 Liberator of the 2d Antisubmarine Squadron, about six hundred miles west of Lorient. This attack was actually against .

References

Bibliography

External links

 

World War II submarines of Germany
German Type IX submarines
U-boats commissioned in 1942
U-boats sunk in 1943
Missing U-boats of World War II
Ships built in Hamburg
1942 ships
U-boats sunk by unknown causes
Maritime incidents in January 1943